Events from the year 1834 in France.

Incumbents
 Monarch – Louis Philippe I

Events
26 February - Treaty of Desmichels signed between Abd-el-Kader and France, recognising him as the independent sovereign ruler of the province of Oran in Algeria.
21 June - Legislative election held for the third legislature of the July Monarchy.

Births
1 January - Ludovic Halévy, author and playwright (died 1908).
9 April - Edmond Laguerre, mathematician (died 1886).
18 May - Auguste-Théodore-Paul de Broglie, professor of apologetics (died 1895).
19 July - Edgar Degas, artist (died 1917).
2 August - Frédéric Bartholdi, sculptor, designer of the Statue of Liberty (died 1904).
30 September - Louis Pierre Mouillard, engineer (died 1897).
16 December - Léon Walras, economist (died 1910).
28 December - Pierre Jean Marie Delavay, missionary, explorer and botanist (died 1895).

Deaths
20 May - Gilbert du Motier, marquis de La Fayette, military officer and former aristocrat (born 1757).
14 July - Edmond-Charles Genêt, ambassador to the United States during the French Revolution (born 1763).
7 August - Joseph Marie Jacquard, silk weaver and inventor (born 1752).
8 October - François-Adrien Boieldieu, composer (born 1775).

References

1830s in France